The 2010 European Karate Championships, the 45th edition, were held in Athens, Greece from 7 to 9 May 2010. A total of 475 competitors participated at the event.

Medalists

Men's competition

Individual

Team

Women's competition

Individual

Team

Medal table

References

2010
International sports competitions hosted by Greece
European Karate Championships
European championships in 2010
Sports competitions in Athens
2010s in Athens
Karate competitions in Greece
May 2010 sports events in Europe